Philip North Holloway  (22 March 1917 – 28 May 2003) was a New Zealand politician of the Labour Party.

Biography

Early life and career
Holloway was born in Hokitika in 1917. His father was an Anglican parson and he received his secondary education at Waitaki Boys' High School. He attended the University of Otago, but did not finish his degree because he went overseas in 1936. He was a door-to-door salesmen for vacuum cleaners in England before undertaking more study at Boston University. He then became a public circuit lecturer in the United States before returning to London and briefly became an assistant to prominent Labour MP Sir Stafford Cripps from 1938 to 1939. Upon returning to New Zealand he briefly worked for 2ZB. When World War II broke out, Holloway joined the army. He was a second lieutenant with the 26th Battalion, and saw service in North Africa and Italy.

Returning to New Zealand following the war he married Joyce Martin in 1946, with whom he had one daughter. From 1947 to 1950 he was an importer-distributor and was a member of the Price Tribunal. He was for a time the secretary of the Wellington Journalists Union and later employed by the Labour Party from 1953 to 1954. He was a "loyal Orangeman" and disliked the Catholic Irish.

Political career

At the 1947 local-body elections he stood unsuccessfully for the Wellington City Council on a Labour ticket (along with all other Labour candidates).

He represented the Heretaunga electorate from 1954 to 1960, when he retired. He was both Minister of Industries and Commerce and Minister for Science and Industrial Research from 1957 to 1960 in the Second Labour Government. In that role, he was involved in the negotiations with Australia and eventually led to a free trade agreement. Holloway initiated several capital works initiatives to improve New Zealand's manufacturing capacity. He oversaw the construction of the Comalco smelter in Bluff, the Whangarei oil refinery and the New Zealand Steel smelter at Glenbrook.

By then he was disillusioned by politics and rationalised his unexpected departure stating there is "only so much one could do in politics".

Looming over his retirement, was the fact he had been involved in a very public stoush due to a libel case. It quoted the importer as saying he had an ease-of-passage remedy for controlled imports, stating: "See Phil, and Phil will fix it", and reported that the reference was to Holloway who as Minister of Industries and Commerce was in charge of import controls. Holloway vehemently denied the suggestion and sued the paper for libel and sought  in damages. The nation was gripped by the trial which focused heavily on the derivations and meanings of the word "fix". The defence led by Robin Cooke took appeals all the way to the Privy Council in London. The court case that lasted 14 months, and eventually he was awarded  in damages and a further  in costs, a record sum for the times.

Holloway's early retirement also had other reasons. He wrote to Prime Minister Walter Nash early in 1960 to inform him he would not be standing again. Privately he lamented the fact that neither caucus or party member meetings had energy or enthusiasm any more. In the letter Holloway remarked that he thought Labour's party organisation was "pathetically weak" and that the future of both the party and the government was "not bright until there is a re-assessment of our [Labour's] policy and objectives, and also a re-vitalizing of our organisation".

Post-politics
In 1962 Holloway became manager of the New Zealand branch of the Chandris Shipping Lines. In 1963, after divorcing his first wife Joyce, he married Beverley Woolf with whom he would have another daughter. He remained an active member of the Labour Party and stood twice for the party presidency. He unsuccessfully challenged incumbent president Norman Douglas at both the 1967 and 1968 party conferences.

In 1973, following the election of the Third Labour Government, Holloway was appointed as Ambassador to Italy (with cross-accreditation to Yugoslavia, Egypt and Iraq) and High Commissioner to Malta from 1973 to 1976.

After his return to New Zealand, he became company director of an export company until he retired in 1989. He was a co-owner of a number of successful race horses with his friend Woolf Fisher.

In the 1987 Queen's Birthday Honours, Holloway was appointed a Companion of the Order of St Michael and St George, for public services. He was genuinely surprised with the award.

Death
In early 2001 he became unwell and increasingly disabled following a series of small strokes. Holloway died on 28 May 2003. He was survived by his second wife Beverley, two daughters and one stepson from his second marriage. His funeral was attended by Labour leaders, including then Prime Minister Helen Clark.

Family
One of his daughters was actor and writer Liddy Holloway and a grandson is actor Joel Tobeck.

Notes

References

1917 births
2003 deaths
New Zealand Labour Party MPs
Members of the Cabinet of New Zealand
Ambassadors of New Zealand to Italy
New Zealand Companions of the Order of St Michael and St George
New Zealand MPs for Hutt Valley electorates
People educated at Waitaki Boys' High School
Members of the New Zealand House of Representatives
People from Hokitika
New Zealand military personnel of World War II
Unsuccessful candidates in the 1946 New Zealand general election
Unsuccessful candidates in the 1951 New Zealand general election
New Zealand Army officers